The 2004 Nicholls State Colonels football team represented Nicholls State University as a member of the Southland Conference during the 2004 NCAA Division I-AA football season. Led by first-year head Jay Thomas, the Colonels compiled an overall record of 5–5 with a mark of 2–3 in conference play, placing fourth in the Southland. Nicholls State played home games at John L. Guidry Stadium in Thibodaux, Louisiana.

Schedule

References

Nicholls State
Nicholls Colonels football seasons
Nicholls State Colonels football